The men's 800 metres at the 2019 Asian Athletics Championships was held on 21 and 22 April.

Medalists

Results

Heats
Qualification rule: First 3 in each heat (Q) and the next 4 fastest (q) qualified for the semifinals.

Semifinals
Qualification rule: First 3 in each heat (Q) and the next 2 fastest (q) qualified for the final.

Final

References

800
800 metres at the Asian Athletics Championships